Blue Funnel May refer to:

 Blue Funnel Line, A UK Shipping company operating from 1866 to 1988
 Blue Funnel Group, A UK pleasure and ferry boat company including Blue Funnel Cruises and Blue Funnel Ferries